Don Edwards (1915–2015) was a U.S. Representative from California.

Don Edwards may also refer to:

People 

 Don Edwards (cowboy singer) (1939–2022), American singer and guitarist
 Don Edwards (ice hockey) (born 1955), Canadian ice hockey player
 Don C. Edwards (1861–1938), American politician
 Donald E. Edwards (1937–2018), American state military officer
 Donnie Edwards (born 1973), American football linebacker

Places 
 Don Edwards San Francisco Bay National Wildlife Refuge